Santa María Chilapa de Diaz is a town and municipality in Oaxaca in south-western Mexico. 
It is part of the Teposcolula District in the center of the Mixteca Region.
The name Chilapa means "Water from chiles".

The municipality covers an area of 234.75 km² at an altitude of 1900 meters above sea level.
The climate is mild, averaging about 17 °C.Trees include oak, pine and pitch pine. Wild fauna include coyotes, snakes, lizards and scorpions.

As of 2005, the municipality had 484 households with a total population of 1,687 of whom 151 spoke an indigenous language. Economic activity includes agriculture (corn, beans and wheat) and some cattle ranching. There is a cooperative that processes sugar cane from the state of Veracruz for rum and brandy.  In addition there is a factory making polyethylene products and a third dedicated to manufacture and marketing of raffia.

History 
The foundation date of this town is unknown because in the year 1879 it burned down. All the original titles were lost therefore the only data available was preserved by tradition, and it indicates that the town was founded at the banks of the River Chilar. The name of this town comes from the name of a leader named Lorenzo Cortéz y Salazar who owned the land where the town was established. For their courage and devotion to the Mexican revolution cause the following people from Santa María Villa de Chilapa de Díaz are remembered:Marcelino Ortiz Sierra, Gral. Marcelino Ortiz Sierra, Ángel Fernando Ortiz Segura, Delfino Ortiz Segura, Aarón Ortiz Olivera.

References

Municipalities of Oaxaca